Phil Ionadi is a Canadian businessman, soccer executive, former soccer player, head coach, and the general manager for the Canadian Arena Soccer Association.

He initially began playing college soccer abroad with Belhaven University. After a series of stints in the Canadian National Soccer League he eventually played in the USL A-League in 1998 with the Toronto Lynx, and later with the Montreal Impact. Shortly after he played in the Canadian Professional Soccer League, and began playing indoor soccer in 1999 in the National Professional Soccer League with the Montreal Impact.  After his release from Montreal he played with several clubs in the National Professional Soccer League, and in 2002 returned to the CPSL with the Brampton Hitmen. 

Ionadi would conclude his playing career in the CPSL, where he won two CPSL Championships, was named CPSL MVP, and a four time CPSL All-Star. He also represented Canada at the international level in beach soccer, where he played in the 2005 CONCACAF and CONMEBOL Beach Soccer Championship. After retiring he transitioned into coaching, and was appointed head coach for the Oakville Blue Devils in 2006. In 2018, he returned to coaching as the head coach for the Mississauga MetroStars.

He also contributed in the administrative field of soccer initially beginning in the Canadian Soccer League (CSL) in 2008 as a director of business operations for the Brampton Lions. He eventually sat on the CSL Board of Directors as the Director for Youth, and was instrumental in forming the Canadian Academy of Futbol (CAF) in 2012. In 2017, the Canadian Arena Soccer Association appointed Ionadi as the general manager for the Canada national arena soccer team.

Playing career 
Ionadi began playing at the college level in 1995 with Belhaven University, where he earned NAIA GCAC All-Conference Men's Soccer honors. During the college off season he played in the USISL Premier League with the Jackson Chargers. Before pursuing college soccer he received the opportunity to experience professional soccer in the Canadian Soccer League with the North York Rockets. In 1996, he played with Toronto Italia in the Canadian National Soccer League, where he assisted in securing a treble for the club. The following season he played with league rivals Toronto Supra.

In 1998, the United Soccer League granted Toronto a franchise he featured for the Toronto Lynx in the USL A-League. After appearing in five matches he played the remainder of the season with Glen Shields Sun Devils in the Canadian Professional Soccer League, and was selected for the CPSL All-Stars match. In 1999, he signed with the Montreal Impact, and played an indoor season in the National Professional Soccer League. Throughout his time in the National Professional Soccer League he played with Montreal Impact, and Toronto ThunderHawks. He also participated in the 2000 outdoor season in the A-League, but was released later on.

In 2001, Ionadi returned to the Canadian Professional Soccer League, and signed with expansion franchise the Brampton Hitmen, where he served as the team captain. His most notable achievement with the organization was in the 2003 season where he finished as the club's top goalscorer with 13 goals, and secured the teams first CPSL Championship. As a result of his efforts he was recognized with the CSL MVP award. On May 19, 2005 he signed a contract with expansion franchise Oakville Blue Devils, and was named team captain. In his debut and final season with Oakville he assisted in claiming his second championship title, and establishing a league milestone as Oakville became the first expansion franchise to win the championship title in their debut season.

International career 
Ionadi played with the Canada national beach soccer team, and made his debut on March 3, 2005 against Mexico in the 2005 CONCACAF and CONMEBOL Beach Soccer Championship.

Managerial career
In 2006, Ionadi made the transition to coaching by being appointed head coach for the Oakville Blue Devils in the Canadian Soccer League. In his debut season he won the National Division title, and produced the best offensive and defensive records in the division. In the postseason Oakville was defeated in the opening round to the Windsor Border Stars. He also served as the youth coach for Oakville Soccer Club in 2006.

In 2018, he was named head coach and general manager for the Mississauga Metrostars in the Major Arena Soccer League. After a series of poor performances Ionadi was relieved from his position on March 1, 2019.

Administrative career 
In 2006, along with coaching Ionadi was hired as the academy director for Oakville Soccer Club, where he served from 2007 till 2010. On April 10, 2008, he was selected as the Director of Business Operations for the Brampton Lions in the Canadian Soccer League (CSL). In 2012, he purchased LIKA Sports Inc, and currently serves as the company's chief executive officer. In 2013, he served on the CSL Board of Directors as the Director for Youth, and was awarded the Harry Paul Gauss Memorial Award. In 2012, he was one of founders and served as the president of the Canadian Academy of Futbol (CAF) a soccer development program which consists of different soccer clubs and academies organizing soccer competitions, seasons, tournaments, camps, and showcases. 

In 2017, he was named the general manager for the Canadian Arena Soccer Association. Ionadi ventured into sports management field in 2021 where he became the president for Primetime Sports Marketing Inc.

Managerial stats

Honours

Player 
Brampton Hitmen
CPSL Championship: 1
 2003

Oakville Blue Devils 
CPSL Championship: 1
 2005

Individual
Canadian Soccer League MVP Award: 2003

Managerial 
Oakville Blue Devils 
Canadian Soccer League National Division: 1
 2006

References

Living people
Canadian soccer coaches
Canadian soccer players
Canadian Soccer League (1998–present) players
Association football midfielders
Brampton Stallions (Hitmen) players
Montreal Impact (1992–2011) players
Brampton United players
Toronto Lynx players
SC Toronto players
Toronto ThunderHawks players
A-League (1995–2004) players
National Professional Soccer League (1984–2001) players
Canadian National Soccer League players
North York Rockets players
Toronto Italia players
Canadian Soccer League (1987–1992) players
Canadian Soccer League (1998–present) managers
York Region Shooters players
Jackson Chargers players
USL League Two players
Canadian beach soccer players
Year of birth missing (living people)
Major Arena Soccer League coaches
Association football executives